Bramans is a former commune in the Savoie department in the Auvergne-Rhône-Alpes region in south-eastern France. On 1 January 2017, it was merged into the new commune Val-Cenis.

Twin towns — sister cities
Bramans is twinned with:

  Giaglione, Italy (2010)

See also
Communes of the Savoie department

References

External links

Official site

Former communes of Savoie